Blithe Spirit is a 1945 British fantasy-comedy film directed by David Lean. The screenplay by Lean, cinematographer Ronald Neame and associate producer Anthony Havelock-Allan, is based on actor/director/producer and playwright Noël Coward's 1941 play of the same name, the title of which is derived from the line "Hail to thee, blithe Spirit! Bird thou never wert" in the poem "To a Skylark" by Percy Bysshe Shelley. The song "Always", written by Irving Berlin, is an important plot element in "Blithe Spirit".

The film features Kay Hammond and Margaret Rutherford, in the roles they created in the original production, along with Rex Harrison and Constance Cummings in the lead parts of Charles and Ruth Condomine. While unsuccessful at the box office and a disappointing adaptation for the screen, according to Coward, who wrote the screenplay himself, it has since come to be considered notable for its Technicolor photography and Oscar-winning visual effects in particular and has been re-released several times, notably as one of the ten early David Lean features restored by the British Film Institute for release in 2008.

Plot
Seeking background material for an occult-based novel he is working on, writer Charles Condomine invites eccentric medium Madame Arcati to his home in Lympne, Kent, to conduct a séance. As Charles, his wife Ruth and their guests, George and Violet Bradman barely restrain themselves from laughing, Madame Arcati performs peculiar rituals and finally goes into a trance. Charles then hears the voice of his dead first wife, Elvira. When he discovers that the others cannot hear her, he evasively passes off his odd behaviour as a joke. When Arcati recovers, she is certain that something extraordinary has occurred, but everyone else denies it.

After Madame Arcati and the Bradmans have left, Charles is unable to convince Ruth that he was not joking. Elvira soon appears in the room, but only to Charles. He becomes both dismayed and amused by the situation. He tries to convince Ruth that Elvira is present, but Ruth thinks Charles is trying to play her for the fool, so becoming rather upset, she quickly retires for the night. The following evening, Elvira reappears, further confounding the situation. Relations between Charles and Ruth become strained until he persuades Elvira to act as a poltergeist and transport a vase and a chair in front of his current wife, Ruth.  As Elvira continues her antics, Ruth becomes frightened and runs out of the room.

Ruth seeks Madame Arcati's help in sending Elvira back where she came from, but the medium confesses that she does not know quite how to do so. Ruth warns her disbelieving husband that Elvira is seeking to be reunited with him by arranging his mortal demise. However, ghostly Elvira's mischievous plan backfires; as a result, it is Ruth, not Charles, who drives off in the car she has tampered with and ends up dead. A vengeful Ruth, now too in spirit form, harasses Elvira to the point where she wants to depart the earthly realm.

In desperation, Charles seeks Madame Arcati's help. Various incantations fail, until Arcati realises that it was the Condomines' maid Edith who summoned Elvira. Arcati appears to succeed in sending the spirits away, but it soon becomes clear that both have remained. Acting on Madame Arcati's suggestion, Charles sets out on a long vacation, but he has a fatal accident while driving away and joins his late wives as a spirit himself.

Cast

Production
Coward had turned down offers from Hollywood to sell the film rights, stating that previous American versions of his plays had been "vulgarized, distorted and ruined". The rights were instead sold to Cineguild, one of the independent companies supported by the Rank Organization. The film was shot in Technicolor and marked Lean's first attempt at directing comedy after working on two straight films In Which We Serve and This Happy Breed, both also written by Noël Coward. The film was shot at Denham Studios in May 1944.

Nearby houses were used for exteriors: Denham Mount (Charles' and Ruth's home) and Fairway in Cheapside (Madame Arcati's house); some filming was also done at Blacksmith's Lane. One source mentions a third location: "Condomine House, exteriors".

The play had been a major success, and Coward advised Lean not to jeopardise this with the adaptation, telling him "Just photograph it, dear boy". In spite of this, Lean made a number of changes such as adding exterior scenes, whereas the play had been set entirely in a single room, showing scenes like the car journey to Folkestone which had only been referred to in the play. Perhaps most importantly, the final scene, in which Charles dies and joins his two wives as a spirit, does not occur in the play, which ends with his leaving his house after taunting his former wives, of whom he is now free. Coward objected strenuously to this change, charging Cineguild with having ruined the best play he ever wrote.

As with most of Coward's work, Blithe Spirit is renowned for its sophisticated dialogue. During an argument with Ruth, Charles declares, "If you're trying to compile an inventory of my sex life, I feel it only fair to warn you that you've omitted several episodes. I shall consult my diary and give you a complete list after lunch." The line, considered extremely risqué by censors, was deleted from the US release.

Box office
According to Kinematograph Weekly the 'biggest winners' at the box office in 1945 Britain were The Seventh Veil, with "runners up" being (in release order), Madonna of the Seven Moons, Old Acquaintance, Frenchman's Creek, Mrs Parkington, Arsenic and Old Lace, Meet Me in St Louis, A Song to Remember, Since You Went Away, Here Come the Waves, Tonight and Every Night, Hollywood Canteen, They Were Sisters, The Princess and the Pirate, The Adventures of Susan, National Velvet, Mrs Skefflington, I Live in Grosvenor Square, Nob Hill, Perfect Strangers, Valley of Decision, Conflict and Duffy's Tavern. British "runners up" were They Were Sisters, I Live in Grosvenor Square, Perfect Strangers, Madonna of the Seven Moons, Waterloo Road, Blithe Spirit, The Way to the Stars, I'll Be Your Sweetheart, Dead of Night, Waltz Time and Henry V.

Critical reception
Although it received positive critical reviews, the film was a box office failure on both sides of the Atlantic, but it is now widely regarded as a classic.

In 1944, Variety observed: 

In 1982, Leslie Halliwell wrote: 

In the 21st century, Daniel Etherington of Channel 4 rated it  stars out of five stars and commented:

Awards and nominations
Tom Howard won the 1947 Academy Award for Best Visual Effects. It was nominated for the Hugo Award for Best Dramatic Presentation but lost to The Picture of Dorian Gray.

Home media
Blithe Spirit was released on VHS on July 6, 1995. In September 2004 MGM released the film on DVD in the US as one of eight titles included in the David Lean Collection. Criterion released the box sets "David Lean Directs Noël Coward" on Region A Blu-ray and Region 1 DVD in the US in 2012, both of which contained Blithe Spirit. This release features a new high-definition digital transfer of the BFI National Archive's 2008 restoration, with an uncompressed monaural soundtrack on the Blu-ray. In the UK the rights are owned by ITV and the film has been released three times on DVD, with the last release containing newly restored film and audio.

See also
 Blithe Spirit (2020 film)
 List of ghost films

References
Notes

Bibliography
 Phillips, Gene D. Beyond the epic: the life & films of David Lean. University Press of Kentucky, 2006.

External links

 
 
 
 Review of film at Variety
 Blithe Spirit at the British Film Institute
Blithe Spirit: Present Magic an essay by Geoffrey O'Brien at the Criterion Collection
 Blithe Spirit on Theater Guild on the Air: 23 February 1947

1940s romantic comedy-drama films
1945 films
1940s fantasy comedy-drama films
British black comedy films
British romantic comedy-drama films
British fantasy comedy-drama films
1940s black comedy films
1940s romantic fantasy films
1940s ghost films
Two Cities Films films
British films based on plays
Films produced by Noël Coward
Films directed by David Lean
Films that won the Best Visual Effects Academy Award
Films set in country houses
British drama films
Films scored by Richard Addinsell
Films about the afterlife
1945 comedy films
1945 drama films
1940s British films